Hexpressions is a 1981 game supplement published by Days of Yore.

Contents
Hexpressions is a large rubber stamp that prints a seven-hex pattern: the hexes are 5/8" across, which makes them between 15 and 16mm, and are intended to be used whenever an "instant" hex pattern is needed.

Reception
Steve Jackson reviewed Hexpressions in The Space Gamer No. 42. Jackson commented that "An interesting gimmick! The stamp itself is well made and looks as though it will last a long time. I'll leave it to you whether you need it."

References

Fantasy role-playing game supplements
Role-playing game mapping aids
Role-playing game supplements introduced in 1981